Jeffrey Stephen Bryant (born 27 November 1953) is an English former professional footballer who played in the Football League as a defender.

References

1953 births
Living people
People from Redhill, Surrey
English footballers
Association football defenders
Walton & Hersham F.C. players
Wimbledon F.C. players
AFC Bournemouth players
Ebbsfleet United F.C. players
Tooting & Mitcham United F.C. players
English Football League players
National League (English football) players